Lai Kai Cheuk (born 5 July 1977, Hong Kong) is a former Hong Kong professional footballer who played as a defender and a  defensive midfielder.

References

External links
Lai Kai Cheuk at HKFA

1977 births
Living people
Hong Kong footballers
Hong Kong First Division League players
Hong Kong international footballers
Association football defenders
Association football midfielders
Association football utility players
Hong Kong Rangers FC players
Happy Valley AA players
Sun Hei SC players
Shatin SA players
Eastern Sports Club footballers
Footballers at the 1998 Asian Games
Asian Games competitors for Hong Kong